Belt wrestling is a form of wrestling that is one of the oldest historically recorded sports. It involves two belted contestants aiming to take each other over by grappling with a belt. There are hundreds of national belt wrestling styles, but contemporary most widespread and internationally competed are Alysh and Kurash, developed by the previously nomadic Turkic peoples of Central Asia. United World Wrestling recognized Alysh wrestling as the primary international belt wrestling style. It is regulated globally by the International Federation of Wrestling on Belts Alysh, the sport's governing body. Although the sport has been practiced for millennia, and local championships were held in various places of the world, it was until 2001 when Bayaman Erkinbayev started its international version, and it was called "Alysh". Until 2005, Rif Gaynanov and Bayaman Erkinbayev developed this style together, and then the ways separated. Two different styles appeared named "Alysh" and "Kurash" belt wrestling. Since then, the sport has been included in the 2013 Summer Universiade program, recognized by the Asian Olympic Council, and contested at the Asian Games and Asian Indoor Games. The sport's executives struggle to promote it to the level of an official Olympic sport.

History

Ancient times
Gilgamesh engages in a form of belt wrestling with Enkidu in the Epic of Gilgamesh written around 2000 BC about a king of Sumer who lived around 2800 to 2600 BC. One of the oldest recorded illustrations of wrestling is a bronze statuette, dated to around 2600 BC, found in 1938 at Khafaji, near Baghdad and now stored in the National Museum of Iraq. Chinese Tangshu chronicles also mention belt wrestling in the Medieval China circa the 11th century. In the 11th century the scholar and philosopher Avicenna wrote about this type of wrestling.

Present day

The International Federation
To accommodate the many variations of belt wrestling throughout the world, the philosophy of the new International Belt Wrestling Association (IBWA) founded in 2005 now headed by Mr. KHALIL AHMED KHAN of Pakistan has been simple and logical; it has adopted two sets of standard rules and a standard costume. Their reasoning is that some styles do not permit trips and some do. However, according to the new association, to compete without trips is called ‘classical style’ and with trips is called ‘free style’. The standard costume is an attractive feature, which allows for all styles to be completed so that no participant can conclude that his or her national style or costume has been slighted. IBWA unites all belt wrestling lovers in the world. Mr. Khalil Ahmed Khan is Chairman of Ad Hoc Advisory Committee Traditional Sports and Games, UNESCO and President of International Association of Traditional Wrestling Sports - IATWS. IATWS is a key partner of Traditional Sports and Games, UNESCO(Ref). The newly created official platform by UNESCO Advisory Committee on TSG is the "[ International Council of Traditional Sports and Games]" (ICTSG) has already awarded the membership to IATWS and IBWA. Belt Wrestling has been included in the First World Traditional Sports and Games Festival to be held in Astana- Kazakhstan 2021. The International Council of Traditional Sports and Games (ICTSG) is an international organization aiming to serve as an international platform for the preservation, promotion, and development of traditional sport and games (TSG) at the global level. It is the initiative of the UNESCO Advisory Committee and approved by UNESCO. These Games will be the first of their kind whilst giving a boost to tourism, local traditions, and culture of its Host Country. Anti-Doping in Traditional sports In today’s highly competitive sporting environment, athletes and athlete support personnel are under increasing pressure to do whatever it takes to win. ICTSG and UNESCO Convention against Doping in Sport are committed to preserve fair sport and to protect young people involved in traditional sports from the use of prohibited substances. Gender equality through Traditional sports Promoting gender equality and empowering women through traditional sports and games is one of ICTSG's main objectives. Khalil Ahmed Khan is President of the International Council of Traditional Sports and Games (ICTSG) and Shammi Rana is Secretary-General of the International Council of Traditional Sports and Games (Ref).

The rules and variation of the rules
Different parts of the world have different variations on certain rules in the sport. As the name suggests, the central component of the sport is a simple device, such as a belt, an ordinary towel, or girdle. For example, within Central Asia, Kuresh wrestling of Turkic people is popular. It is distinguished by throwing an opponent by tearing him away from the floor or from the mat without using one’s legs. Such rules are usually specific to that particular region. As a result, the rules of the game can differ between continents or even countries.

Former Honorary President of the International Association of Traditional Types of Sports Rif Gainanov once stated, "This type of wrestling will always be interesting. Every nation has its own coloring. One nation should not impose its own rules upon other countries and should respect other cultures and their customs".

However, today it is necessary to understand the differences between:

1) the rules of national wrestling in every single country or region, of which there are surely thousands of variations;

2) and a common, well-defined system of belt wrestling rules, which makes it possible for athletes from around the world to come together in a competition as equals.

3) the belt wrestling has been accredited as a "Traditional Sports" by the UNESCO Advisory Committee on TSG.

The sport today
Today wrestling, as a national sport, cannot be ascribed to any single country. In a similar way, people generally do not refer to soccer as an English sport or basketball to be American. Belt wrestling does not have any national boundaries. It is unique and gathering more and more fans. The circle of contestants is widening considerably. This is a spectacular and democratic sport and one that does not require much financial expenditure. An important fact is that the International Belt Wrestling Federation considerably lessened the number of injuries received by contestants since the introduction of the new rules. As it was proved, the correction of this or that wrestling rules popularized this kind of sport. Nowadays world and continental championships are being held in different parts of the world.

The sport is developing rapidly and has become so prominent that President Putin of Russia attended the 6th World Championships in Ufa, the capital of Bashkortostan, from 9 to 13 October 2007.

In America and Oceania the popularity of belt wrestling is no less than that in Iran, Turkey, Germany, Pakistan, Turkmenistan, Kyrgyzstan, Ukraine, Russia, Lithuania, Uzbekistan, Kazakhstan, Togo, and Spain - countries which have already been the hosts of international competitions. This is how one more step towards the main aim - inclusion in the Olympic Games – is being made. Several years ago, very few people knew anything about belt wrestling. Today, the International Association is getting applications for holding tournaments from all corners of the globe. This is no surprise as now the army of admirers of this kind of sport unites more than eighty countries of the world.

The IBWA is an organization that serves as an international platform under the leadership of its President Khalil Ahmed Khan for the popularizing and developing traditional wrestling/belt wrestling throughout the world irrespective of race and political followings. The Association takes part in the exchanging of know-how, knowledge, information, and data, referring to the traditional wrestling/belt wrestling which, in turn, contributes to its development and popularization on local, national, regional and international levels. Belt Wrestling as a sport is recognized by the Asian Olympic Council from 2007 and is included in the program of Asian Martial Arts & Indoors Games 2017.

There are many types of traditional belt wrestling in the world, but by developing this sport's general rules under the leadership of Dr. Rif Gaynanov (†) former President, and Khalil Ahmed Khan current President of IBWA/IATWS became a real home for all types of traditional belt wrestling in the world and a common platform for developing and promoting new-old sport discipline – belt wrestling.

Today IBWA governs different belt wrestling disciplines: freestyle, classical style, female belt wrestling, beach belt wrestling, snow belt wrestling in five age groups: cadets, juniors, students, seniors, and veterans in 12 weight categories (7 for men and 5 for women).

All IBWA events are with the line of the IOC vision which include seven components: sport – belt wrestling competition, culture – folklore youth festival and competition on local traditional wrestling style, science – scientific conference on developing and promotion of traditional sport and game, environment – tree planting action "Plant-for-the-Planet" or beach cleaning action "Creation" with art exhibition, sport for development and peace – training seminars between border conflict/post-war countries under the slogan "Play for Peace", healthy lifestyle promotion - Olympic mile "Fun Run", youth – youth leadership forum " New generation of leadership".

Belt wrestling is also one of the disciplines of the Worldwide Nomad Games.

Asian Belt Wrestling Federation(ABWF) is continental body of International Belt Wrestling Association and International Association of Traditional Wrestling Sports.H.E. Khalil Ahmed Khan is President of Asian Belt Wrestling Federation and Shammi Rana Secretary-General of Asian Belt Wrestling Federation and Rapporteur of Traditional Sports and Games, UNESCO ABWF. The Belt Wrestling has been treated and accepted as the old traditional sports in the Central Asia region.

Amateur Belt Wrestling Federation of India Executive Board meeting of Amateur Belt Wrestling Federation of India was held under the Chairmanship of Dr. SM Bali, Joint Secretary Indian Olympic Association at Hotel Ashoka on 16/01/2017 and Shammi Rana, Secretary-General Asian Belt Wrestling Federation(ABWF).Dr. SM Bali was elected as President, Aman Kumar Sharma Vice President and Tarsem Sharma elected as Secretary-General of Amateur Belt Wrestling Federation of India

Competitions

Multi-sport events

Worldwide
Summer Universiade 
World Combat Games
World Martial Arts Masterships
World Nomad Games
World Wrestling Games

Regional
Asian Games 
Asian Beach Games
Asian Indoor Games
Asian Indoor and Martial Arts Games

Sub-Regional
Southeast Asian Games

World Belt Wrestling Championships

Senior
The first edition of the championships in 2002 saw competition in the openweight, therefore only two events were contested (men and women.) The 2003' championships were subdivided into weight classes, but because of the rules of the host country no women competition was allowed. Since 2003 the prize money totalling several hundred thousand U.S. dollars was contested among participating teams. Since the 2005' edition onwards the championships were contested in freestyle (belts) and classic style (kushaks.) The 2008' edition saw championships contested at an open-air competition area, on sand, in  air temperature.

Alysh

Kurash

Goresh

Multi-style

Open

Youth

Junior

Cadet

Belt Wrestling World Cup

Regional Championships

African Championships

Asian

European

Pan-American

http://ibwa-w.com/en/history

https://www.koresh-wrestling.org/category/results/

https://www.koresh-wrestling.org/events/

World Koresh Championship (Tatar koresh)
2015, Kazan, Russia, IV

World Goresh Championship
2016, Naberezhnye Chelny, Russia, III

http://ibwa-w.com/en/gallery/photos/photo_gallery133

References

 Notes

External links
https://fbnp-rt.ru/en/about
http://ibwa-w.com/en/history
https://www.koresh-wrestling.org/category/results/
https://www.koresh-wrestling.org/events/
 
 2008 results
 2009 results
 2016 results
Amateur Belt Wrestling Federation India holds meeting

Wrestling